This list of longest caves includes caves in which the combined length of documented passageways exceeds . In some of these caves, passageways are still being discovered.

Geographical distribution 

Caves are found around the world. The largest form in areas of karst landforms whose rocks dissolve easily. Preferable conditions for karst cave formation are adequate precipitation, enough plants and animals to produce ample carbon dioxide, and a landscape of gentle hills which drains slowly. The highest concentrations of long caves in the world are found in the Pennyroyal Plateau of southern Kentucky, United States, in the Black Hills of South Dakota, United States, and in the Yucatán Peninsula, Mexico.

List

See also 
 List of caves
 List of longest cave by country
 List of deepest caves
 Show cave
 Speleology

External links 
 World's Deepest Caves
 World Longest Caves

References 

 Longest Caves
Caves
Caves